H. Graham Motion (born May 22, 1964, in Cambridge, England) is an American horse trainer,  notable for his work with 2011 Kentucky Derby winner Animal Kingdom and Better Talk Now. Motion started out training and winning with his own Thoroughbred horses at age 29, and his first win was with Bounding Daisy in March 1993 at Laurel Park Racecourse. Graham's father worked as a bloodstock agent. He worked for Johnathan Shepard as an assistant trainer from 1985 through 1990. He then worked as an assistant under trainer Bernie Bond in 1991, then assumed Bond's stable when the trainer retired after 1992. Motion now lives in Fair Hill, Maryland.

Trainer standings
Motion finished in the top ten of all Maryland conditioners nine times, including seven straight years from 1995 through 2001. He led all trainers with five stakes wins in the 2008 Pimlico spring meet. He won his 1,000th race at Laurel Park Racecourse on November 6, 2006. In 1997 he finished with a career-best 150 races won. In 2008, Motion finished in the top twelve trainers in earnings nationally with over $6,900,000.

References

1964 births
American horse trainers
Kent School alumni
Living people